Ramón Ruiz Nieves is a Puerto Rican politician from the Popular Democratic Party (PPD). Ruiz was elected to the Senate of Puerto Rico in 2012. Ruiz was elected once again in the election in 2020 as District Senator.

Ruiz was born in Arecibo. He has a Master's degree in Administration and Labor Law. Ruiz has also worked as a chemist. He is currently married, with three children, and lives in Lares.

Ruiz ran for a seat in the Senate of Puerto Rico under the Popular Democratic Party (PPD). After winning a spot on the 2012 primaries, he was elected on the general elections to represent the District of Ponce. 
Ruiz won primary in 2020 for District Senator and obtained victory in General Elections in November 2020 under the Popular Democratic Party. Once again being the Senator representing the District of Ponce.

See also
25th Senate of Puerto Rico

References
 Ramón Ruiz Profile on El Nuevo Día

Living people
People from Arecibo, Puerto Rico
Members of the Senate of Puerto Rico
Popular Democratic Party members of the House of Representatives of Puerto Rico
1965 births